= Julia Lieblich =

American journalist and writer

- Born: April 25, 1958
- Died: November 2023 (aged 65)
- Education: Harvard Divinity School
- Occupation: Journalist

Julia Lieblich (April 25, 1958 – November 2023) was an American journalist and author specializing in human rights and religion.

== Education ==
Lieblich graduated from Harvard Divinity School with a master’s degree in theological studies in 1992. She was a research fellow at Northwestern Law School’s Center for International Human Rights.

== Career ==
In 1983, she wrote an article for The New York Times Magazine about nuns which later became her book, Sisters: Lives of Devotion and Defiance, published in 1992.

Lieblich taught writing and was an assistant professor at Loyola University Chicago.

== Books ==
- Sisters: Lives of Devotion and Defiance (Crossroad Publishing, 1994)
- co-authored with Esad Boskailo Wounded I Am More Awake: Finding Meaning After Terror (Vanderbilt University Press, 2012)

== Personal life ==
Lieblich died in November 2023 at the age of 65. She lived in Cambridge.
